Team Seattle is an endurance auto racing team and charitable organization founded by racing driver Don Kitch, Jr. in 1997 to raise funds for the Seattle Children's Hospital.  Team Seattle's drivers and other supporting teams who compete in the 24 Hours of Daytona gain pledges from donors based on the number of laps their cars can complete over the event.  Since first entering Daytona in 1997, Team Seattle has raised over $3.3 million for Seattle Children's.  A new endeavor for 2009 will have Team Seattle participate in another endurance event, the 24 Hours of Le Mans in France, and also raise funds for the Mecenat Chirurgie Cardiaque Enfants du Monde.  The team's driving squad will include American actor Patrick Dempsey.

History

Team Seattle debuted at the 1997 24 Hours of Daytona, backing a Porsche from the Alex Job Racing team, before expanding to two cars in 1998.  The two car effort was boosted in 1999 by the addition of professional drivers Kelly Collins, Anthony Lazzaro, and Cort Wagner who led one of two Team Seattle-backed Alex Job Porsches to victory in their class.  In 2000 Team Seattle began a partnership with The Racer's Group, another Porsche squad, before switching to the faster GTS category in 2002 with Park Place Racing's Saleens.

Team Seattle made their first entry into the sports prototype categories by joining with Essex Racing in 2003, where they finished first and second within their class in a Lola-Nissan.  Essex Racing switched to Multimatic-Fords in 2004, but were not able to repeat their success in the new Daytona Prototype category.  The team returned to Porsches in the lower categories in 2005 with a two-car effort with Synergy Racing, joined by corporate backing from Microsoft in 2006.  Team Seattle made another partnership in 2008, joining Farnbacher-Loles Racing.

2009 Le Mans entry

Team Seattle announced a partnership with Italian racing team AF Corse to apply for an entry to the 2009 24 Hours of Le Mans, not only to raise funds for Seattle Children's, but also for the French Mecenant Chirurgie Cardiaque.  Although initially being granted a reserve entry, Team Seattle was granted a full entry on March 31, 2009, following the withdrawal of another competitor.  Team Seattle made use of a Ferrari F430 GT2 from AF Corse's Advanced Engineering squad.  Founder Don Kitch, Jr. and racing driver Joe Foster were joined by actor Patrick Dempsey, a regular competitor in the Rolex Sports Car Series.

Pledges to the team were raised not only by the car's lap total, but also by allowing donations in exchange for personal photos to be added to the car's paint scheme.  The team expected to raise $1 million at the event.

References

External links
 Team Seattle
 Racing for Children  

American auto racing teams
Children's charities based in the United States
Charities based in Washington (state)
Sports charities
WeatherTech SportsCar Championship teams
24 Hours of Le Mans teams